Events from the year 1591 in India.

Events
 Hyderabad, India established by Muhammad Quli Qutb Shah and Charminar built

Births
 Mir Jumla II, subahdar of Bengal (died 1663)

Deaths
 Meherji Rana Parsi spiritual leader dies (born 1514)
 Koti & channayya (death) are twin legends of dakshina Kannada district Karnataka

See also

 Timeline of Indian history